Hermann Kriege (1820-1850) was a German American revolutionary and journalist of the first half of the 19th century.

His journalistic activities supporting socialist ideas caused him to be arrested and jailed in 1844. After serving his sentence he traveled to Bremen, then London, and finally to New York.

In New York he wrote for the Volks-Tribun, a German language newspaper active in the 1840s. Following the Revolutions of 1848 he briefly returned to Germany but left soon after for the United States again. This time he settled in Chicago, where he became editor of the newly-formed Illinois Staats-Zeitung, a position he held until 1849, when he again returned to New York.

Kriege suffered from mental illness and died in the Bloomingdale Insane Asylum in 1850, at age 30.

References
 Die Väter unserer Republik in ihrem Leben und Wirken. Thomas Paine. Uhl, New York 1848.

American socialists
German socialists
German emigrants to the United States
1820 births
1850 deaths
19th-century American newspaper editors
Illinois Staats-Zeitung people
New York (state) socialists
Illinois socialists